Vexillum angulosum is a species of sea snail, a marine gastropod mollusk, in the family Costellariidae, the ribbed miters.

Description
The length of the shell attains 54 mm.

Distribution
This species occurs in the Indian Ocean.

References

 Marrow M.P. (2019). Seven new species of Vexillum (Gastropoda: Costellariidae) from Western Australia. Acta Conchyliorum. 19: 77–94.

External links
 Küster, H. C. (1838-1841). Die Familie der Walzenschnecken. (Volutacea, Menke.) Systematisches Conchylien-Cabinet von Martini und Chemnitz, ed.2, 5(2): vii-x, pp. 1-234, pls A, B, 1-49, 17a-e. Published in parts
  Liénard, Élizé. Catalogue de la faune malacologique de l'île Maurice et de ses dépendances comprenant les îles Seychelles, le groupe de Chagos composé de Diego-Garcia, Six-îles, Pèros-Banhos, Salomon, etc., l'île Rodrigues, l'île de Cargados ou Saint-Brandon. J. Tremblay, 1877.

angulosum
Gastropods described in 1839